Éric Brulon (born 2 September 1960) is a French wrestler. He competed in the men's freestyle 68 kg at the 1984 Summer Olympics.

References

External links
 

1960 births
Living people
French male sport wrestlers
Olympic wrestlers of France
Wrestlers at the 1984 Summer Olympics
Place of birth missing (living people)